The 2011 Belfast West by-election was a by-election for the United Kingdom constituency of Belfast West following the resignation of the constituency's Member of Parliament, Gerry Adams
in advance of his candidacy in the 2011 general election in the Republic of Ireland. A writ for a by-election was moved in the House of Commons on 16 May 2011, and the vote took place on 9 June 2011.

Background
Gerry Adams had held Belfast West for Sinn Féin from 1983 to 1992, and continuously since 1997. At the 1992 UK general election and in the 1974 and 1979 elections, the seat was won instead by the Social Democratic and Labour Party (SDLP), an Irish nationalist party, but by the 2010 general election, they were a long way behind Adams, the seat being the safest in Northern Ireland and the fourth safest anywhere in the UK. A constituency of the same name, with boundaries identical to the Westminster constituency which existed before the 2010 election, was contested at the 2007 Northern Ireland Assembly election, using the single transferable vote method of election. Sinn Féin candidates won five of the six seats and the SDLP the other.

In 2010, the two main unionist parties, the Democratic Unionist Party (DUP) and the Ulster Unionist Party (UUP), both stood candidates in the seat, but took only 10.7% of the vote between them. The DUP did hold one of the six Assembly seats until 2007. Although the UUP have not held their deposit in recent years, they held the Parliamentary seat until 1966.

Vacation of the seat

Members of the House of Commons, whether or not they have taken their seats, cannot resign in form, but a legal fiction has grown up to allow Members to resign in effect. Under Section 4 of the House of Commons Disqualification Act 1975, if an MP wishes to vacate their seat, they can request appointment to either of two 'offices of profit under the Crown' which disqualify them from membership. As an Irish republican, Gerry Adams considered a British Crown appointment politically unacceptable, and therefore submitted a letter resigning his seat to the Speaker of the House of Commons on 20 January 2011; he maintained that by doing so he had simply resigned. Notwithstanding that he had not requested it, Adams was on 26 January appointed as Crown Steward and Bailiff of the Manor of Northstead, a Treasury spokesperson explaining that this appointment had been made "consistent with long-standing precedent". Although David Cameron said during Prime Minister's Questions that Adams had "accepted an office for profit under the Crown", Adams denied this and received an apology from the Prime Minister's Office for not informing him of the procedure and for stating that he had applied for the "post".

Calling the by-election
In order for a by-election to take place, an MP makes a motion in the House of Commons to the Speaker to issue a warrant to the Clerk of the Crown in Chancery, who then issues the writ ordering that the election take place. Traditionally, the MP comes from the same party as the member that has stood down. However, because Sinn Féin MPs do not take their seats in the Commons, the writ was moved by the Government Chief Whip, Conservative Patrick McLoughlin MP on 16 May 2011.

Candidates
Alex Attwood, the Environment Minister in the Northern Ireland Executive, and the Social Democratic and Labour Party's candidate for the seat at the 2010 general election was the SDLP candidate for the by-election.

Brian Kingston was the Democratic Unionist Party candidate.

Paul Maskey, a member of the Northern Ireland Assembly, won the Sinn Féin nomination. Danny Morrison, the former publicity director of Sinn Féin, had suggested that the party should stand aside and instead back a candidacy for former Respect Party MP George Galloway.

Results

By-election

Previous General Election

See also
1903 Belfast West by-election
1943 Belfast West by-election
1950 Belfast West by-election
List of United Kingdom by-elections
Opinion polling for the 2015 United Kingdom general election

References

External links 
A Vision Of Britain Through Time (Constituency elector numbers)
Northern Ireland Elections

Belfast West by-election
Belfast West by-election
West
21st century in Belfast
2011 elections in Northern Ireland